Thambematidae is a family of isopods belonging to the order Isopoda.

Genera:
 Microthambema Birstein, 1961
 Thambema Stebbing, 1912

References

Isopoda